Kamil Krofta (17 July 1876 – 16 August 1945) was a Czech historian and diplomat.

Life and career

Born and schooled in Plzeň, he studied history in Prague starting in 1894, then from 1896 to 1899 in Vienna. From 1901 he worked at the National Archives. Beginning in 1911, he was a professor of Austrian (and later, Czech) history at Charles University, following the Jaroslav Goll school of thought. In his research, he focused on the late medieval and early Czech history, especially that of the peasantry as well as the church.

In 1920, he became the first Czechoslovak envoy to The Vatican and was instrumental in the mutual recognition of both states. From 1922 until 1925, he resided as envoy in Vienna and lectured at the Comenius University in Bratislava. From 1925 to 1927 he was the Czechoslovak envoy in Berlin. After returning to Prague, he headed the Presidium of the Ministry of Foreign Affairs. Krofta was a key foreign policy advisor to Edvard Beneš who headed the Ministry until he became President of Czechoslovakia in 1935. Krofta served as Minister of Foreign Affairs from 29 February 1936 until 4 October 1938. He succeeded Milan Hodža.

Krofta became an active participant in the resistance during the German occupation of Czechoslovakia in World War II through the National Revolution Preparatory Assembly (Přípravný národní Revoluční výbor). In 1944, was he arrested and initially held at Pankrác Prison. He was later moved to the Small Fortress in Terezín and remained incarcerated until the camp was liberated in May 1945. He died in Prague a few months later as a result of the abuse and neglect during imprisonment. He was awarded Order of Saint Sava.

Selected publications

 Kurie a církevní správa zemí českých v době předhusitské
 Řím a Čechy před hnutím husitským
 Historia Fratrum a Rozmlouvání starého Čecha s mladým rytířem
 Listy z náboženských dějin českých
 Bílá hora
 Přehled dějin selského stavu v Čechách a na Moravě
 Čtení o ústavních dějinách slovenských
 Čechové a Slováci před svým státním sjednocením
 Žižka a husitská revoluce
 Z dob naší první republiky
 Nesmrtelný národ
 Malé dějiny československé

References

External links
 Kamil Krofta via Open Library
 

1876 births
1945 deaths
Writers from Plzeň
People from the Kingdom of Bohemia
Politicians from Plzeň
Czech Freemasons
Foreign ministers of Czechoslovakia
Government ministers of Czechoslovakia
Ambassadors of Czechoslovakia to Germany
Recipients of the Order of Tomáš Garrigue Masaryk
Ambassadors of Czechoslovakia to Austria
Ambassadors of Czechoslovakia to the Holy See
Recipients of the Order of St. Sava
Czech resistance members
Czechoslovak civilians killed in World War II
Resistance members who died in Nazi concentration camps
Charles University alumni